In physics and applied mathematics, analytical regularization is a technique used to convert boundary value problems which can be written as Fredholm integral equations of the first kind involving singular operators into equivalent Fredholm integral equations of the second kind. The latter may be easier to solve analytically and can be studied with discretization schemes like the finite element method or the finite difference method because they are pointwise convergent. In computational electromagnetics, it is known as the method of analytical regularization. It was first used in mathematics during the development of operator theory before acquiring a name.

Method 

Analytical regularization proceeds as follows. First, the boundary value problem is formulated as an integral equation. Written as an operator equation, this will take the form

with  representing boundary conditions and inhomogeneities,  representing the field of interest, and  the integral operator describing how Y is given from X based on the physics of the problem.  

or 

In general, several choices for  will be possible for each problem.

References 

 
 
, Paperpack  (also available online). Read Chapter 8 for Analytic Regularization.

External links 
 E-Polarized Wave Scattering from Infinitely Thin and Finitely Width Strip Systems
 

Diffraction
Electromagnetism
Applied mathematics
Computational electromagnetics